Rolf Amrein (1 August 1929 – 20 April 2019) was a Swiss sailor. He competed at the 1968 Summer Olympics and the 1972 Summer Olympics.

References

External links
 

1929 births
2019 deaths
Swiss male sailors (sport)
Olympic sailors of Switzerland
Sailors at the 1968 Summer Olympics – Star
Sailors at the 1972 Summer Olympics – Star
Sportspeople from Lucerne
20th-century Swiss people